Richard James Davey Jr. (born April 5, 1942) is a retired American college basketball coach. Davey is best known for being head men's basketball coach at Santa Clara University from 1992 to 2007. Most recently, Davey was the associate head men's basketball coach at Stanford University under head coach Johnny Dawkins from 2008 to 2012 and helped Stanford win the 2012 National Invitation Tournament.

Early life, education, and baseball career
Born in San Francisco, Davey grew up in Ceres, California. His father, also named Dick Davey, played college basketball at Modesto Junior College and the University of San Francisco and was later a basketball coach at Ceres Union High School. At Ceres Union High, Davey played on three sports teams as a football quarterback, basketball guard, and baseball catcher.

After graduating from Ceres Union in 1960, Davey attended the College of the Pacific (later University of the Pacific) in Stockton, playing on the varsity basketball team at guard from 1961 to 1964 and varsity baseball from 1962 to 1964. Under head coach Dick Edwards in 1963–64, Davey averaged 9.0 points and 4.5 rebounds in 26 games on a 15–11 Pacific Tigers men's basketball team. On the Pacific Tigers baseball team, Davey earned All-West Coast Athletic Conference honors in 1963 and 1964. Davey graduated from Pacific with a Bachelor of Arts in education in 1964. 

After graduating, Davey played minor league baseball in the San Francisco Giants farm system as a catcher and outfielder, for the Decatur Commodores in 1964 and Magic Valley Cowboys in 1965. Davey played 60 games in his minor league baseball career, batting .172 with 23 RBI. Davey retired from baseball due to an injury.

Coaching career

Early coaching career (1967–1977)
From 1967 to 1972, Davey was head basketball coach at Leland High School in San Jose, California. Davey went 61–53 in five seasons at Leland, with a third-place finish in the 1971 Central Coast Section playoffs in his final season there. Reuniting with his former Pacific coach Dick Edwards, from 1972 to 1977, Davey was an assistant coach at the University of California, Berkeley under Edwards.

Santa Clara assistant coach (1977–1992)
Davey moved to Santa Clara University in 1977 and served as assistant to longtime Broncos head coach Carroll Williams. Davey would serve as Williams's top assistant for 15 years, during which Santa Clara had 10 winning seasons including six 20-win seasons. Santa Clara's most successful stretch in that era was in the 1980s with winning records in all but the 1985–86 season. The 1980s for Santa Clara also had four NIT appearances in 1984, 1985, 1988, and 1989 and an appearance in the 1987 NCAA tournament.

Santa Clara head coach (1992–2007)
On September 9, 1992, Davey was promoted to head coach after Williams became athletic director at Santa Clara. In his first season, Davey's Broncos finished third but won the WCC tournament and became only the second no. 15 seed team to win in the first round, defeating no. 2 Arizona 64–61 on March 18, 1993.

Led by future NBA MVP Steve Nash, Santa Clara would go on to win the West Coast Conference regular season title in 1995 and 1996 and qualified for the NCAA Tournament both years. Santa Clara signed Davey to a contract extension on March 29, 1995.

The 10-seed Broncos beat Maryland in the first round in 1996. After Nash moved on to the NBA, Santa Clara won a third straight WCC regular season title in 1997, this time led by senior guard Marlon Garnett.

Santa Clara would continue to have consistent winning seasons under Davey, with an 18–10 record in 1997–98, 19–12 in 1999–2000, and 20–12 in 2000–01. However, the program went on a downturn afterwards with five straight losing seasons.

On January 7, 2003, CollegeInsider.com named Davey the Mid-Season Coach of the Year for achieving a 9–4 start to the season with an injury-depleted roster where multiple walk-ons took over starting roles. Santa Clara would finish the 2002–03 season 13–15 (4–10 WCC) but improved to 16–16 (8–8 WCC) in 2003–04. 

The 2004–05 Broncos started 3–1 following an upset of no. 4 and eventual national champion North Carolina on November 19 in the Pete Newell Challenge at The Arena in Oakland. However, Santa Clara finished the season 15–16 (7–7 WCC).

Davey retired as Santa Clara coach on February 1, 2007. The San Francisco Chronicle reported, citing anonymous sources, that top university administrators and major donors wanted a new head coach and a larger basketball budget. In Santa Clara's next game on February 3 at Saint Mary's, Davey got a standing ovation from Saint Mary's fans and a gift argyle sweater from Saint Mary's head coach Randy Bennett, and Santa Clara won 63–57, resulting in sole possession of second place in WCC standings. Santa Clara finished Davey's final season 21–10 (10–4 WCC) for the first winning season in six years. Ken Pomeroy also ranked Santa Clara's defense as the best in the WCC that season.

In late 2007, the authorized biography Dick Davey: A Basketball Life Richly Led was self-published by Chuck Hildebrand, sportswriter and friend of Davey.

Stanford associate head coach (2008–2012) 
On June 16, 2008, Davey came out of retirement to become associate head coach at Stanford under new head coach Johnny Dawkins. Davey joked that during his interview with Dawkins, "I gave him a list of reasons why he shouldn’t hire me, including my age and the fact that I couldn’t turn a computer on."

Stanford finished the 2008–09 season with a 20–14 (6–12 Pac-10) record, with wins over ranked Arizona State and California teams and a third round 2009 College Basketball Invitational appearance. After two straight losing seasons, Stanford improved to 26–11 (10–8 Pac-12) with the 2012 NIT championship in 2011–12. Davey retired from Stanford after the NIT.

Personal life
Davey is married to Jeanne Davey. They have two children, including Mike Davey, a longtime basketball head coach at Saratoga High School.

Head coaching record

References

External links
 Santa Clara profile

1942 births
Living people
American men's basketball coaches
American men's basketball players
Baseball catchers
Baseball outfielders
Baseball players from California
Basketball coaches from California
Basketball players from California
California Golden Bears men's basketball coaches
College men's basketball head coaches in the United States
Decatur Commodores players
High school basketball coaches in California
Magic Valley Cowboys players
Pacific Tigers baseball players
Pacific Tigers men's basketball players
People from Ceres, California
Santa Clara Broncos men's basketball coaches
Stanford Cardinal men's basketball coaches